
Stambourne is a village and civil parish in the Braintree District in north Essex, England. The civil parish population at the 2011 Census was 409. Stambourne's closest neighbouring villages are Ridgewell, Toppesfield, Cornish Hall End and Great Yeldham.

History 
Stambourne derives from an old local dialect term for 'stony brook'.
 
A part of the British 17th-century witchcraft trials, the spinster Sarah Houghton of Stambourne, in 1663, was charged by the authorities with causing John Smyth to become "consumed and made infirme."  A jury, including John Levett and Matthew Butcher, found Houghton guilty, and she was ordered to be hanged. She was reprieved after the jury had rendered their judgment.

Dame Gwen Ffrangcon-Davies, a stage actress of the early- and mid-20th century, lived in Stambourne in later life, dying in 1992 at the age of 101.

Community 
The parish church of St Peter and St Thomas Becket dates from the 11th century and is a Grade I listed building.

Every year a bonfire and fireworks display is held in the village playing field. The event attracts people from surrounding areas (including Great Yeldham, Hedingham and Halstead).

The local handyman is known for lighting the bonfire every year wearing short shorts and a cowboy hat.

See also
Stambourne Hall

References

External links

Main website for Stambourne, with a brief history of Stambourne and access to its history document
Website for St Peter & St Thomas’ Church, Stambourne, part of the Upper Colne Valley Parishes

Villages in Essex
Braintree District
Witch trials in England